The Italian Catholic Diocese of Massa Carrara-Pontremoli is in Tuscany. It is a suffragan of the Archdiocese of Pisa.

The historical Diocese of Massa Carrara had its name changed in 1939 to Diocese of Apuania; and again in 1986 to Diocese of Massa. In 1988 it was united with the Diocese of Pontremoli.

History

The see of Massa Carrara was created in 1822 at the instance of Duchess Maria Beatrice, and its first bishop was Francesco Maria Zoppi. It was then suffragan of the Archdiocese of Pisa; but for a period from 1855 was a suffragan of the Archdiocese of Modena.

Bishops

Diocese of Massa 
Erected: 18 February 1822
Latin Name: Massensis
Metropolitan: Archdiocese of Pisa

Francesco Maria Zoppi (17 Nov 1823 – 1 Oct 1832 Resigned)
Francesco Strani (23 Jun 1834 – 16 Dec 1855 Died)
Giacomo Bernardi (16 Jun 1856 – 23 Dec 1871 Died)
Giovanni Battista Alessio Tommasi (6 May 1872 – 7 Aug 1887 Died)
Amilcare Tonietti (25 Nov 1887 – 12 Jun 1893 Appointed, Bishop of Montalcino)
Emilio Maria Miniati (18 May 1894 – 29 Apr 1909 Resigned)
Giovanni Battista Marenco, S.D.B. (29 Apr 1909 – 7 Jan 1917 Appointed, Titular Archbishop of Edessa in Macedonia)
Giuseppe Bertazzoni (30 Jun 1917 – 2 Jul 1933 Died)
Cristoforo Arduino Terzi, O.F.M. (11 May 1934 – 10 Jul 1945 Resigned)

Diocese of Apuania
Name Changed: 20 July 1939
Latin Name: Apuaniensis
Metropolitan: Archdiocese of Pisa

Carlo Boiardi (30 Oct 1945 – 24 Feb 1970 Died)
Aldo Forzoni (23 Apr 1970 – 23 Feb 1988 Retired)

Diocese of Massa
Name Changed: 30 September 1986
Latin Name: Massensis

Aldo Forzoni (23 Apr 1970 – 23 Feb 1988 Retired)

Diocese of Massa Carrara-Pontremoli
United: 23 February 1988 with the Diocese of Pontremoli
Latin Name: Massensis-Apuanus
Metropolitan: Archdiocese of Pisa

Bruno Tommasi (23 Feb 1988 – 20 Mar 1991 Appointed, Archbishop of Lucca)
Eugenio Binini (20 Jul 1991 – 19 May 2010 Retired)
Giovanni Santucci (19 May 2010 – January 2021 Resigned)
Gianni Ambrosio (Apostolic administrator, 15 January 2021 –)

Notes

Massa Carrara
Religious organizations established in 1822
Massa Carrara
1822 establishments in Italy